Idleyld Park is an unincorporated community in Douglas County, Oregon, United States. Idleyld Park is located along Oregon Route 138 northeast of Glide. Idleyld Park has a post office with ZIP code 97447.

Climate
This region experiences warm (but not hot) and dry summers, with no average monthly temperatures above 71.6 °F.  According to the Köppen Climate Classification system, Idleyld Park has a warm-summer Mediterranean climate, abbreviated "Csb" on climate maps.

References

External links
Photo of the community's post office by Jimmy Emerson

Unincorporated communities in Douglas County, Oregon
Unincorporated communities in Oregon